France has been represented by 54 athletes at the 2007 World Championships in Athletics. Romain Mesnil (pole vault) and Yohann Diniz (50 km walk) won France's two silver medals. France sent a young squad, with 29 of the 54 total athletes under 25 years old (53%).

Team
The 23 athletes with the best marks were:
 Christine Arron : 100 m, 200 m, 
 Muriel Hurtis-Houairi : 200 m, 
 Adrianna Lamalle : 100 m haies, 
 Sophie Duarte : 3000 m steeple
 Julie Coulaud : 3000 m steeple
 Élodie Olivares : 3000 m steeple
 Melanie Skotnik : HJ
 Vanessa Boslak : PV
 Eunice Barber : LJ 
 Teresa Nzola Meso Ba : TJ
 Manuela Montebrun : HT
 Marie Collonvillé : Heptathlon
 David Alerte : 200 m, 
 Mehdi Baala : 1500 m
 Ladji Doucouré : 110 m hs
 Bouabdellah Tahri : 3000 m steeple
 Mahiedine Mekhissi-Benabbad : 3000 m steeple
 Vincent Zouaoui Dandrieux : 3000 m steeple
 Romain Mesnil : PV
 Romain Barras : Decathlon
 Yohann Diniz : 50 km walk
 Eddy Riva : 50 km walk
 David Boulanger : 50 km walk

Then, there are 12 athletes with good marks at the National Championships or with IAAF-Standard-A

 Solen Désert : 400 m, 
 Maria Martins : 1500 m
 Mélina Robert-Michon : DT
 Amélie Perrin : HT
 Eddy De Lépine : 200 m,  
 Leslie Djhone : 400 m, 
 Mounir Yemmouni : 1500 m
 Bano Traoré : 110 m hs
 Naman Keïta : 400 hs,  (testosterone case announced by IAAF)
 Jérôme Clavier : PV
 Julien Kapek : TJ
 Yves Niaré : SP

References 

Nations at the 2007 World Championships in Athletics
World Championships in Athletics
France at the World Championships in Athletics